Chartered Environmentalist (CEnv) is a professional qualification in the United Kingdom that is awarded by the Society for the Environment through its 24 Licensed member organisations (listed below).

Chartered Environmentalists come from no single profession but operate across all professional sectors. During the last 7 years, over 7000 professionals have registered as Chartered Environmentalists.  Their qualification (CEnv) denotes sound knowledge, proven experience and a profound commitment to sustainable best practice within their particular profession and field of expertise.

Licensed Member Bodies

 Arboricultural Association (AA)
 Chartered Association of Building Engineers (CABE)
 Chartered Institute of Architectural Technologists (CIAT)
 Chartered Institute of Building (CIOB)
 Chartered Institution of Wastes Management (CIWM)
 Chartered Institution of Water and Environmental Management (CIWEM)
 Energy Institute (EI)
 Institute of Agricultural Managers (IAgrM)
 Institute of Chartered Foresters (ICF)
 Institution of Engineering Designers (IED)
 Chartered Institute of Ecology and Environmental Management (CIEEM)
 Institute of Environmental Management and Assessment (IEMA)
 Institute of Fisheries Management (IFM)
 Institute of Materials, Minerals and Mining (IOM3)
 Institution of Agricultural Engineers (IAgrE)
 Institution of Chemical Engineers (IChemE)
 Institution of Civil Engineers (ICE)
 Institution of Environmental Sciences (IES)
 Institution of Mechanical Engineers (IMechE)
 Institute of Water (IWater)
 Royal Institution of Chartered Surveyors (RICS)
 Royal Society of Chemistry (RSC)
 Society of Environmental Engineers (SEE)
 Society of Operations Engineers (SOE)

See also
Chartered Engineer
Chartered Scientist

References

External links
Society for the Environment
Institute of Environmental Management and Assessment
The Institution of Environmental Sciences
Chartered Institute of Wastes Management
IAgrE Institution of Agricultural Engineers
 Chartered Institute of Architectural Technologists

.
Env